Gregory Edwin Bateman (born 20 June 1989) is a former English rugby union player.  Bateman has previously played for the Dragons, Dorking, London Welsh, Exeter Chiefs and Leicester Tigers.  He has played in all three front row positions, but primarily played as loosehead prop.

Bateman joined Exeter Chiefs from former Aviva Premiership side London Welsh for the 2013/14 season. Bateman is a former product of the Harlequins academy.

On 18 February it was announced that Bateman was due to join Leicester Tigers for the 2015/16 season. He left ahead of the 2020–21 season.

On 1 September 2020 it was confirmed he had signed for Pro14 side Dragons.

Bateman retired at the end of the 2021–2022 season.

References

External links
Premiership Rugby Player Profile 

Living people
1989 births
Exeter Chiefs players
Leicester Tigers players
English rugby union players
London Welsh RFC players
Dragons RFC players
Rugby union props
Rugby union players from Frimley